Callao is a station on Line 3 and Line 5 of the Madrid Metro. It is located in fare Zone A.
It is named after the Plaza del Callao, under which it is located.

References 

Line 3 (Madrid Metro) stations
Line 5 (Madrid Metro) stations
Railway stations in Spain opened in 1941